is a small deserted island west by northwest of Cape Sōya, Wakkanai, Hokkaidō, Japan. It is the northernmost piece of land under Japanese control. Another island called  lies southeast of Benten-jima.

It is named after Benzaiten, once enshrined on the island. The wildlife includes many seabirds, Steller sea lions, kombu kelp, and sea urchins; it has been recognised as an Important Bird Area (IBA) by BirdLife International because it supports a large breeding colony of black-tailed gulls.

Photos

See also

 Geography of Japan
 Japanese Archipelago
 Extreme points of Japan
 Desert island
 List of islands

References

External links
 宗谷岬弁天島におけるトド調査始まる (The survey of Steller sea lions has begun on Bentenjima Island, Cape Sōya), from マリンネット北海道 (Marine Net Hokkaidō).

Uninhabited islands of Japan
Extreme points of Japan
Islands of Hokkaido
Important Bird Areas of Japan
Seabird colonies